Virginia Tech Montgomery Executive Airport  is a public airport named for nearby Virginia Tech and located three miles (5 km) south of the central business district of Blacksburg, a town in Montgomery County, Virginia, United States.

Facilities and aircraft 

For the period ending August 1, 2020, the airport had 16,700 aircraft operations, an average of 45 per day: 96% general aviation, 2% air taxi and 2% military.  BCB is an instrument flight rules airport with GPS approaches to both runways, a LOC/DME approach to runway 12, a non-precision NDB approach, and an automated weather observing system (AWOS-3).

The airport officially opened in 1931 as VPI Airport (Virginia Tech was previously abbreviated VPI).  University cadets trained to fly there during World War II.  A new terminal building was completed in 1996, and the airport took its current name in 2002.

References

External links 
 

Airports in Virginia